Edge of Tomorrow (also known as Live Die Repeat: Edge of Tomorrow) is a 2014 American science fiction action film starring Tom Cruise and Emily Blunt with Bill Paxton and Brendan Gleeson in supporting roles. Directed by Doug Liman with a screenplay written by Christopher McQuarrie and the writing team of Jez and John-Henry Butterworth, its story is adapted from the 2004 Japanese light novel All You Need Is Kill by Hiroshi Sakurazaka. The film takes place in a future where most of Europe is occupied by an alien race. Major William Cage (Cruise), a public relations officer with limited combat experience, is forced by his superiors to join a landing operation against the aliens, only to find himself experiencing a time loop as he tries to find a way to defeat the invaders.

In late 2009,  purchased the rights to All You Need Is Kill and sold a spec script to the American studio Warner Bros. Filming began in late 2012, taking place in England: at WB Studios in Leavesden, outside London, and other locations, such as London's Trafalgar Square and the coastal Saunton Sands. A total of nine companies handled the visual effects.

Warner Bros. spent over $100 million advertising Edge of Tomorrow. The film received positive reviews from critics, who praised the plot, direction, action sequences, and performances. It grossed over $370.5 million worldwide in its theatrical run.

Plot
In 2015, aliens called "Mimics" arrive in Germany via an asteroid and swiftly conquer most of continental Europe. By 2020, the United Defense Force (UDF), a global military alliance established to combat the alien threat, finally achieves a victory over the Mimics at Verdun using newly developed mech-suits. In Britain, the UDF plans a major invasion of France, and General Brigham orders recently attached public affairs officer Major William "Bill" Cage to cover it. Cage, having no combat experience, objects and threatens to blame Brigham if the invasion fails. Brigham has Cage arrested and sent to Heathrow Airport, now a military base. Cage awakens to find Brigham has demoted him to a private and falsely labelled him a deserter. He is assigned to Master Sergeant Farell and the misfit J-Squad, all of whom dislike and belittle him.

On the morning of the invasion, Farell and J-Squad are quickly killed by the Mimics who were somehow aware of their planned invasion and ambushed them. Cage uses a Claymore mine to kill an unusually large blue Mimic but is mortally wounded by the explosion and covered in the alien's blood. Cage jolts awake to find himself back at Heathrow, reliving the previous morning. His attempts to warn Farell against the invasion are ignored and he experiences the loop of dying on the beach and waking at Heathrow repeatedly. With every subsequent loop, Cage's battlefield skills become more and more impressive. During one loop, Cage tries to save Sergeant Rita Vrataski, a celebrated hero of the battle of Verdun. Upon seeing his preternatural talent, Vrataski realizes Cage can loop time and orders him to find her the next time he wakes up.

Cage reawakens and locates Vrataski, who takes him to Dr. Carter, an expert in Mimic biology. He explains that the Mimics are a superorganism in which the "Omega" controls the cerebrum, while the "Alphas" behave as the ganglia through which the Omega controls ordinary Mimics; if an Alpha is terminated, the Omega resets the day and adjusts its tactics until the battle is won. Cage inadvertently "hijacked" their ability to reset time through his exposure to an Alpha's blood. Vrataski had this ability at Verdun, using it to win the battle before she was wounded and received a blood transfusion, losing the power. She tells Cage to locate and kill the Omega to end the alien invasion.

Over many more loops, Vrataski trains Cage to excel in combat. After a frustrating lesson, Cage escapes to London, only to discover that the Mimics will attack there next after the invasion. After seeing visions of a dam in Switzerland where the Omega is hiding and spending many loops figuring how to escape the invasion and reach the dam, Cage grows closer to Vrataski, but she is only interested in the mission. Convinced that the pair always reach a point on the journey where Vrataski is killed no matter what they do, Cage flies to the dam alone. The Omega is not there and he is ambushed by an Alpha which attempts to strip him of his ability to reset time, but Cage deliberately drowns himself.

Cage and Vrataski infiltrate the Ministry of Defence, where Cage convinces Brigham to give him Carter's prototype device (which Brigham had confiscated from Carter before sending him to a psych ward) that can locate the Omega, but they are pursued by military police on leaving. During the ensuing car chase, Cage uses the device and discovers the Omega is under the Louvre Pyramid in Paris. Cage is seriously injured during capture and wakes up in a hospital to find he has been given a blood transfusion and has lost the ability to loop time.

Vrataski frees Cage and they recruit J-Squad to help destroy the Omega before the invasion begins. They fly to Paris, where the soldiers sacrifice themselves so that Cage and Vrataski can reach the Louvre. Before luring away an Alpha standing between them and the submerged Omega, Vrataski kisses Cage to thank him for getting her as far as he did. The Alpha kills Vrataski and mortally wounds Cage, but he manages to drop a belt of grenades that destroys the Omega.

As a dying Cage floats down into the Omega's blood, he awakens en route to his first meeting with Brigham, who announces on TV that Mimic activity has ceased following a mysterious energy surge in Paris. Cage goes to Heathrow, now a Major again, and sees that all of J-Squad is alive. He later finds Vrataski, who doesn't recognize him; Cage laughs.

Cast

 Tom Cruise as Major William Cage
 Emily Blunt as Sergeant Rita Vrataski
 Bill Paxton as Master Sergeant Farell
 Brendan Gleeson as General Brigham
 Noah Taylor as Dr. Noah Carter
 Jonas Armstrong as Skinner
 Tony Way as Kimmel
 Kick Gurry as Griff
 Charlotte Riley as Nance
 Franz Drameh as Ford
 Dragomir Mrsic as Kuntz
 Masayoshi Haneda as Takeda
 Madeleine Mantock as Corporal Julie Montgomery
 Harry Landis as Old Man 3

Crew

 Doug Liman – director
 Christopher McQuarrie – co-writer
 Jez Butterworth – co-writer
 John-Henry Butterworth – co-writer
 Erwin Stoff – producer
 Tom Lassally – producer
 Jeffrey Silver – producer
 Gregory Jacobs – producer
 Jason Hoffs – producer
 Dion Beebe – cinematographer
 Oliver Scholl – production designer
 Kate Hawley – costume designer
 James Herbert – editor
 Laura Jennings – editor
 Christophe Beck – composer
 Nick Davis – visual effects supervisor

Production

Development and writing
Viz Media published All You Need Is Kill in North America in 2009 as one of four translated Japanese science fiction novels that initiated its Haikasoru imprint. After drawing the interest of producer Erwin Stoff, his company  Entertainment optioned the novel that same year.  collaborated with the publisher's filmmaking subsidiary Viz Productions, headed by Jason Hoffs. Viz Media president Hidemi Fukuhara served as executive producer. Instead of making a pitch to a major studio to purchase the property and proceed with writing and producing a film adaptation, the company developed a spec script to show the studios. Stoff approached writer Dante Harper and sent him a copy of the novel. Harper found the book "too complex" to properly adapt, but, despite the prospect of not getting paid, he chose to "risk it" and accepted the job, taking eight months to write the script. Upon completion, Warner Bros. purchased it in a  deal in April 2010. The studio hired Doug Liman to direct the film the following August. Harper's screenplay was listed in the 2010 edition of the Black List, a survey of most-liked unproduced screenplays.

In June 2011, Joby Harold was hired to rework the screenplay. By September, Warner approached Brad Pitt to star; after he declined, the studio then approached Tom Cruise. Once Cruise accepted, the script changed the age of the leading role to fit the actors. In December 2011, Cruise officially joined the film. Emily Blunt entered negotiations to star opposite Cruise in April 2012. Screenwriting duo Roberto Orci and Alex Kurtzman also delivered a draft of their own.

Six months before filming started, Liman discarded two-thirds of Harper's original script. Jez Butterworth and John-Henry Butterworth were hired to rewrite the script. Screenwriter Simon Kinberg took over from the Butterworths, and eight weeks before the start of filming, he was replaced by Christopher McQuarrie. McQuarrie was introduced to the project while directing Cruise in Jack Reacher. While reading the earlier script McQuarrie "understood very clearly what the premise of the story was and what they were looking for in terms of characters". Even if the previous scripts were darker, Cruise stressed the importance of the story's humor to McQuarrie. The actor compared Cage's violent demises to Wile E. Coyote and the Road Runner, declaring, "It's fun coming up with new ways to kill yourself."

The screenplay did not yet have a satisfactory ending, and, despite the producers and studio executives worried about starting filming without a set conclusion, Liman opted to finish the script during principal photography. McQuarrie at one point suggested adding a twist involving the Mimics figuring out Cage's attack on Paris and resetting time during his strike, but discarded it as "you were so exhausted by the time you got to that point." Eventually, McQuarrie considered that focusing on the comedic aspects meant "it needed to end in a way that wasn't harsh", and thus opted to end the plot where it started, on the helicopter bringing Cage to London, fulfilling the notion that "comedies generally have to go back to the way things were".

Filming
Production began at Leavesden Studios near London, which Warner Brothers had purchased as a permanent studio site. WB had been renting space there for its production of the Harry Potter films, but had been leaving the sets up permanently for nearly a decade and eventually chose to make the site semi-permanent. The parts with Tom Cruise in the opening scene were filmed in Liman's editing room, with the actor doing his own make-up and hair, leading the director to say it "may be the most independent thing I've ever done." Though Liman intended to film the beach battle on location, the studio instead had a beach set built at the studio site. The set was surrounded by chroma key green screens, which the visual effects artists later used to extend the beach with plates shot at Saunton Sands in North Devon. It was intended for the battle scenes to be reminiscent of coastal battles during World War II such as the Invasion of Normandy and the Battle of Dunkirk.

The Los Angeles Times said on the second day, Liman "demanded a total reshoot of everything filmed on Day 1", which concerned producers. Filming on the beach set was scheduled to last two weeks, but extended to nearly three months due to what the Los Angeles Times called "the director's self-described 'workshop-y' filming style". Filming also took place in Trafalgar Square in London on Saturday , 2012. The square was closed to the public, and tanks were brought in to film the action scenes. The brief scene in the Square required closing 36 roads, diverting 122 bus routes and booking all available rooms in nearby hotels and a costly restoration of a historic wicket at a local cricket ground after one of the production helicopters knocked it over. A former army base in the village of Barton Stacey in Hampshire was also used as a filming location for two weeks. Filming also took place at Essex & Suffolk former water treatment facilities in Hanningfield, Essex.

Liman said filming took place seven days a week using two crews to film  in addition to what had originally been scheduled. The crew struggled with changeable British weather since the film was supposed to be set in one day and had to maintain the same weather. The indoor beach set also became muddy, requiring the effects artists to enhance the environment with digital sand and surf. Though filming concluded by August 2013, actor Jeremy Piven was added to the cast and extra scenes including him were filmed; ultimately, however, Piven did not appear in the finished film. Cinematographer Dion Beebe made his first feature film with Liman, with whom he had worked previously on commercials. Beebe's approach was to develop "a world under siege, but not a bleak, dark, post-apocalyptic landscape"; Beebe preferred to avoid the saturated bleach bypass look. 35 mm film was used instead of digital cameras to evoke the World War II footage that provided inspiration for the battle scenes.

Battle suits
Production designer Oliver Scholl and his team worked with lead builder Pierre Bohanna to develop concept art for several battle suit options based on contemporary, real-world powered exoskeleton initiatives, such as those supported by DARPA. When director Doug Liman chose a design, the team built an aluminum prototype frame that had pivot points and hinges. Costume designer Kate Hawley contributed a gritty aesthetic design for the color palettes and surface treatments. While the design was meant to be utilitarian, it was also created so the actors could be seen in the suits and also run in them. The team created a foam mock-up of Tom Cruise so the frame could be tailored for him. The team handcrafted  material and  material battle suits in the course of almost five months. There were three versions of the battle suits: "grunts, dogs, and tanks". The battle suit for Blunt's character was given red slash marks "as if to say she had been to hell and back and lived to tell about it."

Cruise, known for performing his own film stunts, also did so in Edge of Tomorrow. Both he and Blunt wore the heavy metal suits. One of the heavier versions was around  due to it being equipped with a mock sniper rifle and rocket launcher. Blunt trained three months for her role, "focusing on everything from weights to sprints to yoga, aerial wire work and gymnastics", and studying the Israeli combat system Krav Maga.

Each actor needed four people to help put on the battle suit. Initially, Cruise needed  to put on the suit and another  to remove it. Between takes, the actors would be suspended by chains from iron frames to take the weight of the suits off their shoulders.

Visual effects
Nine companies handled the visual effects for Edge of Tomorrow under VFX supervisor Nick Davis. Davis worked with the crew of The Third Floor on the film's previsualization process. One major shot involved covering London Heathrow Airport with military troops, vehicles, and aircraft; SPI split some of the work with RodeoFX. Cinesite joined late in the production and developed  for ten key sequences, with 189 appearing in the final cut.

Designers created the alien Mimics to look different from any terrestrial animal. Davis and Liman favored an early model composed primarily of tentacles. SPI's Dan Kramer described its appearance as "heavy black spaghetti" and noted that the modelers faced a challenge creating the tentacled creatures. A technical animator created an Autodesk Maya plugin that made the movement of each tentacle independent. Since Liman did not want the Mimics to look "too organic or terrestrial", Imageworks' artists devised the idea of making the aliens out of an obsidian-like material, "basically a glass that could cut". Various debris was incorporated within the tentacles to give the creature a sense of weight and fast movement. The Alphas were given a definable head area to show their status as more sentient, while receiving a different color and a bigger size compared to the Mimic grunts. Cinesite created the mechanical Mimics used in the training areas, while MPC created the Omega in a digital environment into which the effects artists composited underwater footage filmed at Leavesden's water tank.

Animators created digital versions of the battle suits, at times with the soldiers inside them. On the set, a 3D scanner booth digitized the actors, while hand scanners captured the textures of the practical suits. Imageworks received pieces of the suits for reference. The company's library of reflection data on various materials helped enhance the armor's shading. SPI's crew created the base at Heathrow by merging the set at Leavesden with digitally altered footage from the airport; the film's dropships, barracks and mess halls replaced the existing aircraft. Framestore created the digital Paris and recreated it with photomodeling from three days of visits. Given that the city is a no-fly zone, Framestore's artists obtained their aerial images by climbing an 80-meter crane parked in the Louvre courtyard. The quadcopter dropships were based on the Bell Boeing V-22 Osprey that can tilt its rotors to fly as either planes or helicopters, while having a design closer to the Quad TiltRotor. Aside from the crashed ship on the beachhead and a gimbal set to depict the plane used by Cage's squad, the film used digital models for most ships. The computer-generated dropships had some of Imageworks' heaviest detail given the proximity of the actors to the aircraft in the camp scenes; the effects artists wanted to make sure the ships broke apart realistically during the crashes.

Prime Focus World converted the film into 3D in post-production using the same tools for the stereoscopy as in World War Z and Gravity. The company made use of scans of the cast's faces from film production while vendor Nvizible helped the company convert the hologram table used by Dr Carter.

Music

Composer Christophe Beck was a late addition to the film, taking over from Ramin Djawadi, who was Liman's first choice to replace his frequent collaborator John Powell, as Powell was on sabbatical. Edge of Tomorrow marked Beck's first science fiction film score. To prepare, Beck watched the film with temp tracks, including one from the 2012 film Battleship. He experimented with repeating the music with the scenes, but because this approach did not frequently fit the events on the screen, Beck used minimal repetition in the film. "The day is reset dozens of times in the film and it would get very repetitive to approach that musically the same way every time", Beck recalled. He initially tried for "traditional heroic themes" that involved horns and trumpets, but he said Liman "preferred a non-traditional approach, driven by percussion and distorted orchestra". To that end, Beck used the pizzicato playing technique, "not in the traditional, plinky-plinky-isn't-this-funny way, but a little darker, and always accompanied by some higher concept synth colors". The distorted orchestral samples enhanced the comedic tone of the extended sequences where Cage recurrently dies in battle, as the director felt it was important for the audience to find humor in this sequence. With Liman's approach, the composer said there were "only a couple of traditional themes" in the film, including one for Emily Blunt's character Rita.

Release

Marketing

Warner Bros. invested over $100 million in a marketing campaign for Edge of Tomorrow. The film was initially titled All You Need Is Kill after the light novel, but as filming was ending in July 2013, Warner Bros. changed the title to Edge of Tomorrow; Warner Bros. president Sue Kroll said the title was changed partly due to "negative chatter" about the word "kill" in the title. Doug Liman, who said he rejected the title All You Need Is Kill because it "didn't feel like it was the tone of the movie I had made", wanted to rename the film Live Die Repeat, but Warner decided to use that just as the tagline.

The film was promoted at Comic-Con in San Diego, California in July 2013, and at WonderCon in Anaheim, California in April 2014. Turner Broadcasting, a subsidiary of Time Warner like the studio Warner Bros., promoted the film across its TV properties, including CNN, TNT, TBS, Adult Swim, TruTV, and Funny or Die. Variety said the move "put forth the notion that buying bigger packages of advertisements across a TV company's holdings is a viable option in an increasingly fragmented TV-viewing landscape". Turner also launched a website which would unlock film-related content like "a 3D game, back stories and artwork" if its promotional hashtag was circulated enough through the social media website Twitter.

The teams included YouTube personalities and participants from the TV series American Ninja Warrior. Warner Bros. based the teams on the soldiers from "J Squad" in the film. To promote teamwork, the two teams competed in a Tough Mudder obstacle course.

Box office forecast

Weeks before the film's release, reports in early May 2014 predicted an underwhelming performance in the North American (United States and Canada) box office for Edge of Tomorrow. Variety noted a "worrisome lack of buzz" leading up to the film's release. TheWrap predicted that this competition could potentially affect the opening weekend gross of Edge of Tomorrow. In contrast, Variety said Edge of Tomorrow could serve as counterprogramming to The Fault in Our Stars since that film's demographic is women under 25 years old.

The trade paper said the film was similar to Oblivion, a 2013 science fiction film that also starred Tom Cruise, and that like Oblivion, it would likely perform better outside North America. TheWrap said that the studio focused on theatrical releases in other territories where Cruise "remains a major force" in drawing audiences. Variety, writing from the US perspective, said, "Media reports have been quick to speculate that Edge of Tomorrow may be one of the summer's first big bombs based on the lack of enthusiasm by U.S. audiences. That may come to pass, but these reports downplay the centrality of foreign markets in today's globalized movie industry."

Theatrical run 
It grossed  on its opening weekend. Edge of Tomorrow grossed $ in North America and $ in other territories for a worldwide total of $. After the film's theatrical run, Entertainment Weekly said it had a "lukewarm box-office reception" despite praise from critics.

Opening weekend
The cast and the crew mimicked the film's time loop premise by attending the premieres in a single day, traveling westward to attend them on a staggered schedule.

The Hollywood Reporter called the film's debut a "soft" opening. In many territories, Edge of Tomorrow ranked third behind fellow new release Maleficent and holdover X-Men: Days of Future Past. Deadline.com said the film had good word of mouth, citing significant increases in Saturday grosses compared to the Friday grosses in the United Kingdom, Germany, and Spain. Bloomberg Businessweek reported that  was grossed in the first week of release and summarized its debut, "While it did solid business in Asia, its reception in Germany, France, and the U.K. has been tepid."

Second weekend
In the first week of June 2014, Edge of Tomorrow opened in  markets, including North America, China, Russia, South Korea and France. The debut in China occurred on Monday, to take advantage of the Dragon Boat Festival holiday. Edge of Tomorrows debut in both Russia and South Korea (taking advantage of a five-day holiday) marked Tom Cruise's highest opening weekend in both countries.

The ticket service Fandango reported advance tickets surpassed Tom Cruise's previous film Oblivion, but were being overcome by the competing film The Fault in Our Stars. Edge of Tomorrow grossed  on the opening weekend, ranking it third below The Fault in Our Stars and Maleficent. Polling firm CinemaScore said 61% of the opening weekend audiences were male. It reported that audiences overall gave Edge of Tomorrow a "B+" grade, where younger filmgoers gave "A" and "A−" grades. The Los Angeles Times said the disappointing box office performances of non-franchise films Edge of Tomorrow and Blended, both produced and distributed by Warner Bros. Pictures, indicated risky investments by the studio, which had better success earlier in the year with franchise films The Lego Movie and Godzilla (2014).

Subsequent weekends
In its second weekend of release in North America ( 2014), Edge of Tomorrow had a "light" second-weekend drop of 43% due to word of mouth and grossed  on the second weekend. With approximately  admissions, it grossed . China, Russia, and South Korea, respectively, had the film's largest weekend grosses among the territories.

The film opened second in the weekend rankings behind Maleficent, with an intake of $4.5 million. , with $15.3 million, Edge of Tomorrow is the sixth-highest-grossing foreign movie of the year in Japan, and the 21st overall.

Home media
The home release's packaging downplays the original Edge of Tomorrow title in favor of placing more prominence on the film's original tagline, "Live. Die. Repeat." Media critics believed that the re-branding was an attempt by Warner Bros. to re-launch the film's marketing following its lackluster U.S. box office performance. Posters for the film's theatrical release had similarly placed a larger emphasis on the "Live. Die. Repeat." tagline than the actual title of the film. Similarly, some digital retailers listed the film under the title Live Die Repeat: Edge of Tomorrow. The film ranked first in home media sales for the week beginning , with 62% of sales coming from the Blu-ray version. The DVD and Blu-ray releases grossed  in the United States. On July 5, 2022, Edge of Tomorrow was released on 4K Blu-ray with its original title restored.

Reception

Critical response
Edge of Tomorrow received largely positive reviews from critics, who praised the humor, Liman's direction, the aliens' design, Cruise and Blunt's performances, and the time-loop premise's ability to remain fresh. However, some critics had issues with the film's conclusion. Based on 335 reviews, review aggregation website Rotten Tomatoes reports that 91% of critics gave the film a positive review, with a rating average of 7.5/10. The website's critical consensus reads: "Gripping, well-acted, funny, and clever, Edge of Tomorrow offers entertaining proof that Tom Cruise is still more than capable of shouldering the weight of a blockbuster action thriller." On another aggregator, Metacritic, the film has a weighted average score of 71 out of 100, based on reviews from 43 critics, indicating "generally favorable reviews". Audiences polled by CinemaScore gave the film an average grade of "B+" on an A+ to F scale.

Justin Chang of Variety called Edge of Tomorrow "a cleverly crafted and propulsively executed sci-fi thriller", saying that the film was director Doug Liman's best since The Bourne Identity (2002). Chang said that the screenwriters, with the assistance of the editors, "tell their story in a breezy narrative shorthand (and at times, sleight-of-hand), transforming what must surely be an unbelievably tedious gauntlet for our hero into a deft, playful and continually involving viewing experience". Regarding the relationship between Cruise and Blunt's characters, Chang said "Liman handles it with a pleasing lightness of touch that extends to the proceedings as a whole." He also commended the visual effects of the "expertly designed Mimics" as well as Dion Beebe's cinematography.

Todd McCarthy, writing for The Hollywood Reporter, said the film was "a narratively ambitious sci-fi actioner" that "takes a relatively playful attitude toward the familiar battle tropes". McCarthy said that, despite the humor, he found the time loop premise "tedious" and that "the final stretch becomes dramatically unconvincing and visually murky". However, he also called the effects "exciting, convincing and gritty" and applauded Gleeson and Paxton in their supporting roles. Kenneth Turan of the Los Angeles Times gave the film a positive review, considering the film "a star-driven mass-market entertainment that's smart, exciting and unexpected while not stinting on genre satisfactions" that broke a string of "cookie-cutter, been-there blockbusters".

Edge of Tomorrow was listed on 23 critics' top ten lists of movies of 2014 (out of 201 evaluated).

David Hynes of WhatCulture ranked Dante Harper's original script, All You Need Is Kill (2010), fifth in a list of the "10 Best Movie Screenplays Since 2010", considering certain changes made for the film to be detrimental: "Is it me or does [the title Edge of Tomorrow] suck in comparison? [...] The conflict between Cage and the Mimics is also far more localised to the beach and marine barracks in the screenplay which improves the cohesiveness of the overall story, whereas Cruise finds himself up in a helicopter in no time in the film version."

Accolades

Social commentary

Gender roles

Emily Blunt plays Sergeant Rita Vrataski, a veteran who guides and trains Tom Cruise's character, Major William Cage. Blunt said of her role, "In these male-fueled genres, it's usually the woman who's holding the hand of the guy and he's running through explosions leading her, and I wanted to be doing the leading." Chris Nashawaty, reviewing the film for Entertainment Weekly, called it "the most feminist summer action flick in years". Bustles Alicia Lutes described Rita as "ruthless and exacting in her takedown ... of a bunch of aliens" and said: "This is very much counter to the age-old ideals about ladies being the constant, delicate flowers of emotional heartstring-pulling." Lutes noted how Cage's strength depended on Rita's guidance, as "she trains him, aids him, and protects him (and in turn the fate of humanity) time and time again." Tasha Robinson, writing a piece in The Dissolve about "strong female characters" that lack real purpose in films, said that Rita in Edge of Tomorrow was an exception. Robinson acknowledged that Rita existed to support Cage in his trials, but believed that "the story doesn't degrade, devalue, weaken, or dismiss her".

In contrast, The Wires Esther Zuckerman criticized the inclusion of a romantic relationship in the film, and said of the two characters' kiss: "There's a case to be made that the kiss is simply an acceptance of their fate, but everything we know about Rita up until this point implies that she's a dedicated soldier, and making her a sudden romantic betrays her character." Zuckerman added: "That's not to say she can't soften up a bit as humans do, but the moment reads less like she's accepting her humanity and more like the filmmakers had to acknowledge two attractive leads ... who should lock lips because that's what men and women do in movies." Writing in The Week, Monika Bartyzel also criticized the romance in the film, stating that Rita is the one who kisses Cage, despite knowing him for only a day where he had known her for multiple days via time loop. Bartyzel said that Rita's portrayal was part of a commonly seen motif in which a female character helps a male "Chosen One" character and that this was "the new normal because it allows Hollywood to appeal to feminist concerns while continuing to feed male wish fulfillment". Bartyzel said that Rita "at her most powerful" ultimately serves "to make the male hero into a fighter like herself".

Comparison to video games
Liman said that the film's repeated scenes intentionally paralleled the respawning feature in video games, where players have to start over on a level if their character dies. In the afterword of All You Need Is Kill, author Hiroshi Sakurazaka notes his experience playing video games as a source of inspiration while writing the novel. Salon's Ryan Leas said analyses of the film noted that it "steals from the video game genre". Leas called Edge of Tomorrows looped action "a meta-commentary on the blockbuster genre", saying: "It's a blockbuster interested in the question of how mind-numbing its genre has become to its viewers." Comparing Edge of Tomorrow to film adaptations of video games, Wired's Angela Watercutter said Liman's film was more successful for basing itself on the medium's narrative structure, and for its "ability to continue after 'Game Over' and discover something new".

Future
In a December 2015 interview with Collider, McQuarrie said that Cruise had an idea for a sequel, and that the concept is "locked and loaded." In April 2016, Doug Liman had signed on to direct the sequel, while Race screenwriters Joe Shrapnel and Anna Waterhouse will write the script for the film. In October 2016, Liman stated that the film would "revolutionize how people make sequels", and went on to say that the story is "much better than the original film" and that it's "a sequel that's a prequel." In May 2017, Liman revealed that the title will be Live Die Repeat and Repeat and that both Cruise and Emily Blunt will reprise their roles from the first film. In January 2018, Liman said that Live Die Repeat and Repeat could be his next film and that scheduling issues have been worked out and the film is moving steadily toward a window in which to start production. In March 2018, Liman said that he was now working with Jez Butterworth on a script rewrite for the film. Later that month, Blunt stated that she, Cruise and Liman were all enthusiastic about the project, but also noted that "It's a lot for all the stars to align for everyone to be free at the same time and available to do it at the same time." In March 2019, it was reported that Matthew Robinson would rewrite the screenplay, and in October, Liman confirmed that the script was finished. After numerous delays, Liman said on Instagram that the project was still in "planning stages" as of January 2020. In January 2021, Liman continued to suggest a sequel will eventually happen and merely needs the two stars to pull the trigger. Emily Blunt has since stated that due to the COVID-19 pandemic, the budget for another film would be "too expensive", casting further doubt on a possible sequel.

In February 2022, it was revealed by Village Roadshow Pictures that Warner Bros. Pictures had been developing a television series spin-off of the film with intentions to release the show exclusively on HBO Max.

See also
 List of films featuring time loops
 List of films featuring powered exoskeletons
 List of science fiction films of the 2010s
 The Defence of Duffer's Drift, a 1904 short book with a similar premise

References

External links

 
 
 
 
 
 
 

2014 science fiction action films
2014 films
2014 3D films
3 Arts Entertainment films
American science fiction action films
American science fiction adventure films
American science fiction war films
Military science fiction films
Alien invasions in films
Apocalyptic films
American dystopian films
Annie Award winners
Dune Entertainment films
Films scored by Christophe Beck
Films based on light novels
Films based on science fiction novels
Films directed by Doug Liman
Films produced by Gregory Jacobs
Films set in 2020
Films set in the future
Films set in London
Films set in France
Films set in Paris
Films set in Switzerland
Films shot in Hampshire
Films shot in Hertfordshire
Films shot in London
Films shot at Warner Bros. Studios, Leavesden
Hive minds in fiction
Holography in films
IMAX films
Films with screenplays by Christopher McQuarrie
Time loop films
Village Roadshow Pictures films
Warner Bros. films
Films with screenplays by Jez Butterworth
Films based on Japanese novels
2010s English-language films
2010s American films